Anita Nanez Martinez (born December 8, 1925) is the first Mexican-American member of the City Council of Dallas, Texas. Elected in 1969, she served the City Council for four years and continues to promote Hispanic pride and knowledge in youth throughout the United States, most notably through the Anita N. Martinez Ballet Folklorico.

Biography 
Anita Martinez was born on December 8, 1925, in a poor area of Dallas, populated heavily enough with Mexican nationals to earn the sobriquet "Little Mexico". After completing high school, Anita married Alfred Martinez and raised four children, while volunteering for organizations such as the Dallas Metropolis YWCA and the Jesuit Parents' Club. At the same time, she supported her husband's restaurant business, El Fenix, by joining, and eventually becoming the program director of, the Dallas Restaurant Association Auxiliary. From 1969–1973, Mrs. Martinez served as West Dallas' Republican City Council Woman. In 1969 she ran for City Council as a candidate for the Citizen's Charter Association, a largely white male establishment that had strong influence over city government, and won 52 percent of the vote, making her the first Mexican-American to hold an elected government position in the city of Dallas. In 1975, she began the Anita N. Martinez Ballet Folklorico as a volunteer program aimed at connecting Hispanic youths to their native culture. She also assisted in the opening of the Anita Martinez Recreation Center in 1976 as a haven for children in West Dallas, an establishment she advocated for while on the City Council. The Recreation Center and the Ballet Folklorico are still around today.

Accomplishments 
Martinez began her role as a councilwoman with the goal of using politics to correct faults and vices she saw within her community, namely "crime, narcotics, and misfit teenagers". However, her accomplishments in this area formed only a part of her agenda while serving as a member of the City Council. Other efforts included the implementation of streetlights, paved roads, and sidewalks in her constituents' neighborhoods. After her service as councilwoman ended, she successfully established institutions whose stated aim was to "remove adolescents from the influences of corruption on the streets", including the Ballet Folklorico and her Recreation Center. In addition to employing youths in Dallas, the Ballet Folklorico has inspired more Folkloricos to form, spreading Hispanic pride and culture throughout the country. Martinez has received numerous awards for her volunteer efforts, including the Zonta Award for Constructive Voluntary Contribution to Community and Civic Affairs and the J C Penney Golden Rule Award for Volunteer Service.

References

External links
 Anita Martinez Collection

1925 births
Living people
Dallas City Council members
American politicians of Mexican descent
Women city councillors in Texas
Texas Republicans
Hispanic and Latino American city council members
21st-century American women